In modern medical English, the term typhus refers to a group of rickettsioses only.

Typhus may also refer to:

Medical 
 Typhoid fever or Typhus abdominalis, caused by a subspecies of Salmonella Typhi
 Paratyphoid fever, a disease similar to typhoid fever
 Typhinia, an obsolete synonym for Relapsing fever

Other uses 
 Typhus (monster), a monster in Greek mythology

See also